The National Security and Defense Council of Ukraine (NSDC; , RNBO or RNBOU) is the coordinating state body of the executive power under the President of Ukraine on issues of national security and defense.

It is a state agency tasked with developing and coordinating a policy of national security on domestic and international matters in advising the President of Ukraine (currently Volodymyr Zelensky). All the sessions of the council take place in the Presidential Administration Building. The agency's membership is determined by the President, but it must include the Prime Minister of Ukraine, Minister of Defense, Minister of Internal Affairs, and the Minister of Foreign Affairs. The council is headed by secretary Oleksiy Danilov since 3 October 2019.

Current composition 
As of October 2022, the National Security and Defence Council consists of the following members:

History

Defense Council
The Defense Council was created by the provision of Supreme Council of Ukraine #1658-12 on October 11, 1991. The Defense Council was defined as the highest state body of collegiate governing on matters of defense and security of Ukraine with following goals:
 Protecting sovereignty
 Constitutional order
 Territorial integrity and inviolability of the republic
 Developing strategies and continuous improvement of policy in sphere of defense and state security
 Comprehensive scientific assessment of the military threat nature
 Determining position toward modern warfare
 Effective control over the execution of the tasks of the state and its institutions keeping defense capabilities of Ukraine at the level of defense sufficiency

On January 23, 1992 the President of Ukraine appointed Myroslav Vitovsky as a secretary of the Defense Council, a position which Vitovsky held until November 30, 1995.

Initial composition
 Chairman of the Supreme Council of Ukraine
 Prime Minister of Ukraine
 Head of commission of the Supreme Council of Ukraine on issues of defense and state security of Ukraine
 State Minister on issues of defense, national security and emergency situations in Ukraine
 State Minister on issues of defense complex and conversion of Ukraine
 Minister of Defense of Ukraine
 Minister of Foreign Affairs of Ukraine
 Director of the Security Service of Ukraine
 Commander of Border Troops of Ukraine
 Commander of the National Guard of Ukraine
 Chief of Staff of the Civil defense of Ukraine

After the establishment and elections of the President of Ukraine the composition of the council was reformed on April 9, 1992 by a provision of the Verkhovna Rada (Ukraine's parliament).
 President of Ukraine
 Chairman of the Supreme Council of Ukraine
 Prime Minister of Ukraine
 First Deputy Chairman of the Supreme Council of Ukraine
 Minister of Foreign Affairs of Ukraine
 Minister of Defense of Ukraine
 Minister of Internal Affairs of Ukraine
 Minister of Machine-building, Military-Industrial Complex and Conversion of Ukraine
 Chief of the Security Service of Ukraine
 Commander of the National Guard of Ukraine
 Commander of the Border Guard Service of Ukraine

National Security Council
The Council was originally created under temporary provision on July 3, 1992 as the National Security Council, but significantly revamped and strengthened under President Leonid Kuchma in 1994. The council was headed by a Presidential adviser in national security matters:
 July 1, 1992 - April 19, 1993 Volodymyr Selivanov (Adviser of the President of Ukraine on national security matters - Secretary of National Security Council)
 ''before November 19, 1992 as State adviser of Ukraine on national security matters
 December 1, 1993 - August 5, 1994 Valeriy Kartavtsev (Secretary of National Security Council)
 August 5, 1994 - November 10, 1999 Volodymyr Horbulin (Secretary of National Security Council)
 since October 17, 1994 as Secretary of National Security Council - Adviser of the President of Ukraine on national security matters

On August 23, 1994 President of Ukraine adopted new provision for the Council. After the adaptation of the Constitution of Ukraine on June 28, 1996, the provisions of the council (National Security and Defense Council of Ukraine) were outlined in the Article 107. Thus the National Security Council was merged with the already existing Defense Council of Ukraine and was adapted by the Presidential edict on August 30, 1996.

According to former secretary Andriy Klyuyev, 460 people worked at the Council in 2010, while in April 2012 the number of employees was 90. President Viktor Yanukovych limited the number of employees of the Council to 180 on 9 April 2012.

The agency's membership is determined by the President, but it must include the Prime Minister of Ukraine, Minister of Defense, Minister of Internal Affairs, and the Minister of Foreign Affairs. The head of the council is the President of Ukraine assisted by the secretary whom they are allowed to appoint. In the absence of existing President of Ukraine, such as between elections, the acting chairman of the council is the Prime Minister. The Chairman of the Verkhovna Rada is not a member of the council, but they are allowed to participate in the meetings. Members of the council may also be other chairmen of government bodies of the executive branch. Any other individual is only allowed by special invitation from the Chairman of the Council.

If the President resigns, the Chairman of the Verkhovna Rada becomes the acting head of the National Security and Defense Council.

Secretaries since 1994

Notes

References

External links

 
Official web-site of the President of Ukraine
Official twitter page English language
Official Ukrainian language Twitter page

 

 
Presidency of Ukraine
Ukraine
1991 establishments in Ukraine
Ukrainian intelligence agencies